The Czech Republic national men's volleyball team is controlled by the Czech Volleyball Federation, which represents the country in international competitions and friendly matches. Czech Republic is ranked 30th (as of October 2018) in the FIVB world ranking.

FIVB considers Czech Republic as the inheritor of the records of Czechoslovakia (1948–1993). The Czech team’s first participations in international competitions saw them win a gold medal at the inaugural European Championship in 1948 which kick-started a golden age for the team. They won two more European in 1955 and 1958, two golds at the World Championships of 1956 and 1966, and a further eight medals in other elite tournaments. They took silver at the Tokyo 1964 Olympic Games and followed that with the bronze four years later in Mexico City.

Results

Olympic Games
  1964 Tokyo —  Silver medal (TCH)
  1968 Mexico City —  Bronze medal (TCH)
  1972 Munich — 6th place (TCH)
  1976 Montreal — 5th place (TCH)
  1980 Moscow — 8th place (TCH)

World Championship
  1949 Czechoslovakia –  Silver medal (TCH)
  1952 Soviet Union –  Silver medal (TCH)
  1956 France –  Gold medal (TCH)
  1960 Brazil –  Silver medal (TCH)
  1962 Soviet Union –  Silver medal (TCH)
  1966 Czechoslovakia –  Gold medal (TCH)
  1970 Bulgaria – 4th place (TCH)
  1974 Mexico – 5th place (TCH)
  1978 Italy – 5th place (TCH)
  1982 Argentina – 9th place (TCH)
  1986 France – 8th place (TCH)
  1990 Brazil – 9th place (TCH)
  1998 Japan – 19th place
  2002 Argentina – 13th place
  2006 Japan – 13th place
  2010 Italy – 10th place

World Cup
  1965 Poland —  Bronze medal (TCH)
  1969 East Germany — 5th place (TCH)
  1985 Japan —  Bronze medal (TCH)

World League
  2003 Madrid — 4th place
  2014 Florence — 16th place
  2015 Rio de Janeiro — 15th place
  2016 Kraków — 18th place
  2017 Curitiba — 20th place

Challenger Cup
  2018 Matosinhos –  Silver medal
  2022 Seoul – 4th place

European Championship
  1948 Italy —  Gold medal (TCH)
  1950 Bulgaria —  Silver medal (TCH)
  1955 Romania —  Gold medal (TCH)
  1958 Czechoslovakia —  Gold medal (TCH)
  1963 Romania — 5th place (TCH)
  1967 Turkey —  Silver medal (TCH)
  1971 Italy —  Silver medal (TCH)
  1975 Yugoslavia — 6th place (TCH)
  1977 Finland — 6th place (TCH)
  1979 France — 6th place (TCH)
  1981 Bulgaria — 4th place (TCH)
  1983 East Germany — 5th place (TCH)
  1985 Netherlands —  Silver medal (TCH)
  1987 Belgium — 6th place (TCH)
  1991 Germany — 12th place (TCH)
  1993 Finland — 8th place (TCH)
  1995 Greece — 10th place
  1997 Netherlands — 6th place
  1999 Austria — 4th place
  2001 Czech Republic — 4th place
  2003 Germany — 9th place
   2005 Italy/Serbia and Montenegro — 9th place
  2009 Turkey — 16th place
   2011 Austria/Czech Republic — 10th place
   2013 Denmark/Poland — 16th place
   2015 Bulgaria/Italy — 13th place
  2017 Poland — 7th place
     2019 — 13th place
     2021 — 8th place

European League
  2004 Opava –  Gold medal
  2005 Kazan – 7th place
  2007 Portimão – 9th place
  2012 Ankara – 5th place
  2013 Marmaris –  Bronze medal
  2018 Karlovy Vary –  Silver medal
  2019 Tallinn – 8th place
  2021 Kortrijk – 7th place
  2022 Varaždin –  Gold medal

Current squad
The following is the Czech roster in the 2021 Men's European Volleyball Championship.

Kit providers
The table below shows the history of kit providers for the Czech national volleyball team.

Sponsorship
Primary sponsors include: main sponsors like UNIQA other sponsors: Czech Tourism, Moser, iDNES, Cedok and Rimowa.

See also

Czech Republic women's national volleyball team

References

External links
Official website
FIVB profile
Den s českou volejbalovou reprezentací 

Volleyball men
National men's volleyball teams
Volleyball in the Czech Republic
Volleyball
World champion national volleyball teams